Effiong Eyoh (born 12 July 1996) is a Nigerian football forward who currently plays for Burreli in Kategoria e Parë.

References

External links

1996 births
Living people
Association football wingers
Nigerian footballers
FK Dinamo Tirana players
KF Laçi players
KS Turbina Cërrik players
Besa Kavajë players
KS Shkumbini Peqin players
KF Apolonia Fier players
KS Burreli players
Kategoria e Parë players
Kategoria Superiore players
Nigerian expatriate footballers
Nigerian expatriate sportspeople in Albania
Expatriate footballers in Albania